Skipp Anne Haynes Williamson is an Australian business woman and founder of Partners in Performance, a management consulting firm specialising in business improvement.

In 1998, Williamson launched Partners in Performance after leaving McKinsey & Co. The company is headquartered in Sydney, Australia but their first engagement was in the UK.

In 2019, Williamson was named number one most powerful consultant in Australia by the Australian Financial Review Power list. In 2018, she was named Australia's third most influential consultant, and in 2017 she was named in the Australian Financial Review and Westpac Group 100 Women of Influence awards.

Williamson is a public supporter of LGBTI rights, and in 2016 was listed in the "top 50 LGBTI" executives in Australia. She married her long term partner, Carol Haynes, in 2016 and the couple have two children together. 

Williamson holds a Bachelor of Engineering from the University of Auckland, Master of Engineering from MIT and Master of Philosophy from the University of Oxford. She is a Fellow of the Australian Academy of Technology and Engineering and a member of Chief Executive Women (CEW).

She was born in Auckland, New Zealand.

References

Australian women in business
Living people
Year of birth missing (living people)
University of Auckland alumni
MIT School of Engineering alumni
Alumni of the University of Oxford
Fellows of the Australian Academy of Technological Sciences and Engineering